Railway Mania was an instance of a stock market bubble in the United Kingdom of Great Britain and Ireland in the 1840s. It followed a common pattern: as the price of railway shares increased, speculators invested more money, which further increased the price of railway shares, until the share price collapsed. The mania reached its zenith in 1846, when 263 Acts of Parliament for setting up new railway companies were passed, with the proposed routes totalling . About a third of the railways authorised were never built—the companies either collapsed due to poor financial planning, were bought out by larger competitors before they could build their line, or turned out to be fraudulent enterprises to channel investors' money into other businesses.

Causes 

The world's first recognizably modern inter-city railway, the Liverpool and Manchester Railway (the L&M), opened its railway in 1830 and proved to be successful for transporting both passengers and freight. In the late 1830s and early 1840s, the British economy slowed. Interest rates rose, making it more attractive to invest money in government bonds—the main source of investment at the time, and political and social unrest deterred banks and businesses from investing the huge sums of money required to build railways; the L&M cost £637,000 (£ adjusted for 2015).

By the mid-1840s, the economy was improving and the manufacturing industries were once again growing. The Bank of England cut interest rates, making government bonds less attractive investments, and existing railway companies' shares began to boom as they moved ever-increasing amounts of cargo and people, making people willing to invest in new railways.

Crucially, there were more investors in British business. The Industrial Revolution was creating a new, increasingly affluent middle class. While earlier business ventures had relied on a small number of banks, businessmen and wealthy aristocrats for investment, a prospective railway company also had a large, literate section of population with savings to invest. In 1825 the government had repealed the Bubble Act, brought in during the near-disastrous South Sea Bubble of 1720, which had put close limits on the formation of new business ventures and, importantly, had limited joint stock companies to a maximum of five separate investors. With these limits removed anyone could invest money (and hopefully earn a return) on a new company and railways were heavily promoted as a foolproof venture. New media such as newspapers and the emergence of the modern stock market made it easy for companies to promote themselves and provide the means for the general public to invest. Shares could be purchased for a 10% deposit, with the railway company holding the right to call in the remainder at any time. The railways were so heavily promoted as a foolproof venture that thousands of investors on modest incomes bought large numbers of shares, whilst only being able to afford the deposit. Many families invested their entire savings in prospective railway companies—and many of those lost everything when the bubble collapsed and the companies called in the remainder of their due payments.

The British government promoted an almost totally 'laissez-faire' system of non-regulation in the railways. Companies had to submit a bill to Parliament to gain the right to acquire land for the line, which required the route of the proposed railway to be approved, but there were no limits on the number of companies and no real checks on the financial viability of a line. Anyone could form a company, gain investment and submit a bill to Parliament. Since many Members of Parliament (MPs) were heavy investors in such schemes, it was rare for a bill to not pass during the peak of the mania in 1846, although Parliament did reject schemes that were blatantly misleading or impossible to construct—at the mania's peak there were several schemes floated for 'direct' railways which ran in vast, straight lines across swathes of countryside that would have been difficult to construct and nearly impossible for the locomotives of the day to work on.

Magnates like George Hudson developed routes in the North and Midlands by amalgamating small railway companies and rationalising routes. He was also an MP, but ultimately failed owing to his fraudulent practices of, for example, paying dividends from capital.

The end of the mania 

As with other bubbles, the Railway Mania became a self-promoting cycle based purely on over-optimistic speculation. As the dozens of companies formed began to operate and the simple unviability of many of them became clear, investors began to realise that railways were not all as lucrative and as easy to build as they had been led to believe. Coupled to this, in late 1845 the Bank of England increased interest rates. As banks began to re-invest in bonds, the money began to flow out of railways, undercutting the boom.

The share prices of railways slowed in their rise, then leveled out. As they began to fall, investment stopped virtually overnight, leaving numerous companies without funding and numerous investors with no prospect of any return on their investment. The larger railway companies such as the Great Western Railway and the nascent Midland began to buy up strategic failed lines to expand their network. These lines could be purchased at a fraction of their real value as given a choice between a below-value offer for their shares or the total loss of their investment, shareholders naturally chose the former. Many middle class families on modest incomes had sunk their entire savings into new companies during the mania, and they lost everything when the speculation collapsed.

The boom-and-bust cycle of early-industrial Britain was still in effect, and the boom that had created the conditions for Railway Mania began to cool and then a decline set in. The number of new railway companies fell away to almost nothing in the late 1840s and early 1850s, with the only new lines constructed being by the large companies. Economic upturns in the 1850s and 1860s saw smaller booms in railway construction, but these never reached anywhere near the scale of the mania—partly due to more thoughtful (if still very limited) government control, partly due to more cautious investors and partly because the UK railway network was approaching maturity, with none of the 'blank canvas' available to numerous companies as in the 1840s.

Results 
Unlike some stock market bubbles, there was a net tangible result from all the investment: a vast expansion of the British railway system, though perhaps at an inflated cost. Amongst the high number of impractical, overambitious and downright fraudulent schemes promoted during the mania were a good number of practical trunk routes (most notably the initial part of the Great Northern Railway and the trans-Pennine Woodhead route) and important freight lines (such as large parts of what would become the North Eastern Railway). These projects all required vast amounts of capital, all of which had to be raised from private enterprise. The speculative frenzy of the mania made people much more willing to invest the large sums required for railway construction than they had been previously or would be in later years. Even many of the routes that failed when the mania collapsed became viable (if not lucrative) when each was in the hands of the larger company that had purchased it.

Comparisons 
Railway and Canal Mania can be compared with a similar mania in the 1990s in the stock of telecom companies. The telecom mania resulted in the installation and deployment of a vast amount of fibre-optic telecommunications infrastructure, spurred on from the realisation that the same railway rights-of-way could make affordable conduits for fibre optics. Yet another boom occurred in the period 1995–2000, during the development of the Internet, when many companies were established to promote new services on the growing network. The dot-com bubble collapsed in 2000, and the much more extensive telecoms bubble in 2002 with the bankruptcies of Enron, WorldCom, Global Crossing, and QWest, although some platform companies such as Google and Amazon grew and prospered, diversifying into backbone fibre networks and cloud computing services.

See also
 History of rail transport in Great Britain
 List of early British railway companies
Balloonomania
 Bike boom
 Timeline of transportation technology

References

Bibliography
Wolmar, C, 2007, Fire & Steam: A History of the Railways in Britain, Atlantic Book (London)

External links 
Report and Resolutions of a Public Meeting, Held at Glasgow, on Friday, 20 March 1846, in Support of Sir Robert Peel's Suggestions in Reference to Railways—Peel had commented upon the impolity and danger of allowing too much capital to be invested in railways in too short a period. The merchants of Glasgow evidently agreed in large numbers. From Google Book Search
RailwayMania.co.uk—Narrative of events and links to recent research
The Railway Mania: Not so Great Expectations—Economic article which argues that during the British Railway Mania of the 1840s, railway shares were not obviously overpriced, even at the market peak, but prices still fell dramatically.
Odlyzko, Andrew. Collective hallucinations and inefficient markets: The British Railway Mania of the 1840s, 2010.

1840s in rail transport
1840s in the United Kingdom
1840s economic history
Economic bubbles
History of rail transport in the United Kingdom
Economic history of the United Kingdom
Mania
19th-century fads and trends